Eucereon pseudarchias is a moth of the subfamily Arctiinae. It was described by George Hampson in 1898. It is found in Mexico, Guatemala, Honduras and the Amazon region.

References

 

pseudarchias
Moths described in 1898